Zeev Zalevsky is an Israeli physicist specializing in Optoelectronics. He is a Professor of Electrical engineering and Nanophotonics at Bar Ilan University in Ramat Gan, Israel. He is also a visiting professor in University of Erlangen-Nuremberg at Germany.
He is in the management community of the OASIS, The Optical Association of Israel.

Education
Born in the Russian SFSR in the Soviet Union in 1971, Zalevsky moved to Israel with his family in 1979. He obtained a BSc in Electrical engineering from Tel Aviv University in 1993. He went on to obtain a PhD in Optoelectronics from the same university in 1996, his Doctoral thesis was in the field of Super-resolution. He accepted a position at Bar Ilan University in 2003. He is the head of the Opto-electronics division in the Electrical engineering faculty since then. In 2007, Zalevsky was one of the leading founders of the Bar-Ilan Institute of Nanotechnology & Advanced Materials (BINA).

Research and Work
Zalevsky is best known for his work on Super Resolution. He developed some techniques to overcome resolution limits and in particular for his work in theoretical and experimental definition of various approaches for exceeding Abbe's classical limit of optical resolution.

He broadened the field of Fractional Fourier transform which early defined by V. Namias and published a book on that field.
He published more than 400 papers and 5 books.
The Fractional Fourier transform with applications in optics and signal H. M. Ozaktas, Z. Zalevsky and M. A. Kutay, processing, John Wiley and Sons (2001).
Optical Super Resolution Z. Zalevsky and D. Mendlovic, Springer (2002).
Integrated Nanophotonic Devices''', Z. Zalevsky and I. Abdulhalim, Elsevier (2010).Coherent Light Microscopy: Imaging and Quantitative Phase Analysis'', P. Ferraro, A. Wax, Z. Zalevsky, Springer (2011)

Zalevsky established several optical companies, in 1998 he established the Civcom Ltd. which is a pioneer in the development and manufacturing of cost-saving Opto-electronic components and modules. The company was sold to the Brazilian Padtec corporate in 2008 for $80M. He also established Explay, that was one of the pioneers in pico-projectors field. In 2004 he established Xceed Imaging Ltd. The company is developing a new physical lens for EDOF.

In 2011, Zalevsky's optical heartbeat monitor was selected as one of the "Israel's top 45 greatest inventions of all time".
  
Zalevsky has more than 50 patents in the field of optics including the Kinect motion sensing and the Opto-Phone.

Zalevsky has received several honors, including the International Commission for Optics (ICO) Prize (2008), the Fund Juludan Research Prize (2009) and  the Israeli Young Investigator Award in Nanoscience and Nanotechnology for the year of 2012. In 2021 he was awarded the Joseph Fraunhofer Award/Robert M. Burley Prize from The Optical Society for "significant contributions to the field of optical super-resolution including the invention of many novel concepts bypassing Abbe’s limits of diffraction and the geometric limits set by the sensor."

References

External links
Professor Zalevskys' personal page at Bar Ilan University
Zalevskys' personal page The Bar-Ilan Institute of Nanotechnology & Advanced Materials (BINA)
The Optical Association of Israel
Review on the Prof. Zalevsky invention - The Opto-Phone

1971 births
Israeli electrical engineers
Russian electrical engineers
Tel Aviv University alumni
Academic staff of Bar-Ilan University
Israeli physicists
Living people
Russian physicists
Jewish physicists